"Captain Hook" is a song by Dutch pop group Ch!pz. It reached No. 5 in the Netherlands Top 40 and No. 3 in the Netherlands Top 100. It’s certified Gold according to NVPI.

Charts

Weekly charts

Year-end charts

References

2004 singles
Ch!pz songs
2004 songs